The Great Swamp Watershed Association is a member-based, non-profit, 501(c)(3) conservation organization dedicated to preserving and protecting water and natural areas. Their programs serve all who live, work, or play in the Great Swamp watershed in Morris County, New Jersey. For over 40 years the association has been acting on behalf of local communities to ensure that water is safe and pure and open space is protected.

Five streams in the watershed form the Passaic River, which provides potable water for over a million New Jersey residents.

Their vision for a better world begins with healthy communities in which the water is clean and pure, and natural areas—such as the Great Swamp National Wildlife Refuge, Loantaka Brook Reservation, and Jockey Hollow provide places where people can seek renewal and a sense of peace.

History
The Great Swamp Watershed Association was formed in 1981. It started as a small grassroots organization and has grown to serve 2,200 members in over 40 municipalities in New Jersey.

See also 

Biodiversity
Earth Science
Ecology
List of conservation and restoration organizations
Natural environment
Sustainability

References

Further reading
 
  Quote (from Google search summary): "Morris Township has alerted the state that the nonprofit Great Swamp Watershed Association might be wrongfully spending donations on issues beyond its scope..."
 
Great Swamp Watershed Association. NJ.gov.
Great Swamp Watershed Association. Borough of Madison, New Jersey.
WILD NEW JERSEY: Great Swamp Watershed Association: 24-Hour BioBlitz Will Unearth All Creatures Great and Small
GC2GZ1P Great Swamp Watershed Association (Multi-cache) in New Jersey, United States created by Old Navy

External links
 Great Swamp Watershed Association website

Environmental organizations based in New Jersey
Water organizations in the United States